(1830–1874) was a Japanese samurai of the late Edo period. Kuninori was both the 12th head of the Mizusawa-Date clan and the 26th generation head of the famed Rusu clan, and served as a retainer of the Sendai domain. Known for his good governance, Kuninori amply compensated the people made homeless by the large fire in his holdings at Mizusawa, opening his own stores of food to the public and providing them lumber from domainal holdings for rebuilding their homes. Advising his retainers to be frugal, he had them work for the revival of Mizusawa's town. During the Boshin War, he was sent to Shirakawaguchi in place of his lord, Date Yoshikuni.

Notes

1830 births
1874 deaths
Meiji Restoration
Samurai
Date clan
People of the Boshin War